Sinamia is an extinct genus of freshwater amiiform fish which existed in China, Japan, and possibly South Korea during the Early Cretaceous period. Like the related bowfin, it has an elongated low-running dorsal fin, though this was likely convergently evolved.

Taxonomy 
After

 Sinamia zdanskyi Stensiö, 1935 Meng-Yin Formation, Shangdong, China, Early Cretaceous
 Sinamia huananensis Su, 1973 Yangtang Formation, Anhui, China, Early Cretaceous
 Sinamia chinhuaensis Wei, 1976 Guantou Formation, Zhejiang, China, Early Cretaceous
 Sinamia luozigouensis Li, 1984 Luozigou Formation, Jilin, China, Early Cretaceous
 Sinamia poyangica Su and Li, 1990 Shixi Formation, Jiangxi, China, Early Cretaceous
 Sinamia liaoningensis Zhang, 2012 Yixian Formation, Jiufotang Formation, Liaoning, China, Early Cretaceous (Aptian)
 Sinamia kukurihime Yabumoto, 2014 Kuwajima Formation, Ishikawa, Japan, Early Cretaceous (Barremian)
 Sinamia lanzhoensis Peng, Murray, Brinkman, Zhang and You, 2015 Hekou Group, Gansu, China, Early Cretaceous

References

Amiiformes
Prehistoric ray-finned fish genera
Cretaceous bony fish
Early Cretaceous fish of Asia
Cretaceous China
Fossils of China
Paleontology in Shandong